The Shakee Massacre occurred on June 23, 1925 and resulted in over two hundred casualties due to gunfire by British, French and Portuguese forces in Shaji (called Shakei in Cantonese), Canton, China.

On June 21, 1925, workers in Hong Kong and Canton went on strike in support of the May Thirtieth Movement in Shanghai. Two days later, on June 23, over 100,000 people convened in Eastern Jiaochang (today, the Guangdong Provincial People's Stadium), announcing their plans to expel the foreign powers, cancel the unequal treaties and walk to the Shakee in protest. At 3 am when the protest had moved to the west bridge, the conflict began. British and French soldiers, perceiving gunshots being fired at them, began to fire on the protesters. In addition, British warships fired on the north coast of Shamian (then spelled Shameen). Over 50 were killed and more than 170 people were seriously injured.

Among the dead there were 20 civilians and 23 cadets and military personnel from Whampoa Military Academy. The death toll included one woman and four minors under 16. One estimate listed the dead at 52.

After the massacre, the national government in Canton (now Guangzhou) appealed to the British and French consulates, requesting a formal apology, punishment of related military officers, the removal of warships, the return of Shamian to the national government and reparations for the families of the dead. The request was rejected by the consulates. On October 29 Hong Kong made a counter strike, in which 130,000 from Hong Kong moved back to Canton.

On July 11, Canton held a public memorial ceremony for the casualties of the massacre. The next year, a memorial and a road were built in memory of Shakee. The road was  named 六二三 (Six two three) Road—the numeric date of the event.

See also
 Liao Chengzhi, a survivor of the Shakee Massacre

References

External links
“沙基惨案”亲历见闻
广州沙基惨案纪念碑小了？新立的碑引来争议(图)

History of Guangzhou
1925 in China
Massacres in 1925
June 1925 events
Massacres in China
Massacres committed by France
Massacres committed by the United Kingdom
Mass murder in 1925
1925 murders in China
Events in Guangzhou